Linyphiidae, spiders commonly known as sheet weavers (from the shape of their webs), or money spiders (in the United Kingdom, Ireland, Australia, New Zealand, and in Portugal, from the superstition that if such a spider is seen running on one, it has come to spin the person new clothes, meaning financial good fortune) is a family of very small spiders comprising 4706 described species in 620 genera worldwide. This makes Linyphiidae the second largest family of spiders after the Salticidae. The family is poorly understood due to their small body size and wide distribution, new genera and species are still being discovered throughout the world. The newest such genus is Himalafurca from Nepal, formally described in April 2021 by Tanasevitch. Since it is so difficult to identify such tiny spiders, there are regular changes in taxonomy as species are combined or divided.

 Money spiders are known for drifting through the air via a technique termed “ballooning”.
 Within the agriculture industry, Money spiders are regarded as biological control agents against pests species like aphids and springtails.

Distribution

Spiders of this family occur nearly worldwide. In Norway many species have been found walking on snow at temperatures of down to -7 °C. 

While these spiders are light enough to utilize ballooning for travel, they are limited by the physics of an often turbulent atmosphere and microclimate. For this reason ballooning spiders have little control over where they land, leading to a high mortality rate for the practice and its predominant usage by spiderlings and juveniles. The travel of money spiders by ballooning likely contributes to their vast distribution and speciation.

Predators and prey

 Among birds, goldcrests are known to prey on money spiders.
 Money spiders are known to prey on aphids, springtails, flies, and other spiders.

Taxonomy 
The Pimoidae are the sister group to the Linyphiidae.

There are six subfamilies, of which Linyphiinae (the sheetweb spiders), Erigoninae (the dwarf spiders), and Micronetinae, contain the majority of described species.

Many species have been described in monotypic genera, especially in the Erigoninae, which probably reflects the scientific techniques traditionally used in this family. Common genera include Neriene, Lepthyphantes, Erigone, Eperigone, Bathyphantes, Troglohyphantes, the monotypic genus Tennesseellum and many others. These are among the most abundant spiders in the temperate regions, although many are also found in the tropics. The generally larger bodied members of the subfamily Linyphiinae are commonly found in classic "bowl and doily" webs or filmy domes. The usually tiny members of the Erigoninae are builders of tiny sheet webs. These tiny spiders (usually 3 mm or less) commonly balloon even as adults and may be very numerous in a given area on one day, only to disappear the next. Some males of the erigonines are exceptional, with their eyes set up on mounds or turrets. This reaches an extreme in some members of the large genus Walckenaeria, where several of the male's eyes are placed on a stalk taller than the carapace.

A few spiders in this family include:
Bowl and doily spider, Frontinella communis
Filmy dome spider, Neriene radiata
Blacktailed red sheetweaver, Florinda coccinea
Orsonwelles, a genus of giant Hawaiian Linyphids containing the largest Linyphiid, O. malus.
Erigone atra, a dwarf spider

Genera 
, the World Spider Catalog accepts the following genera:

Abacoproeces Simon, 1884 — Austria, Russia
Aberdaria Holm, 1962 — Kenya
Abiskoa Saaristo & Tanasevitch, 2000 — Poland, Russia, China
Acanoides Sun, Marusik & Tu, 2014 — China
Acanthoneta Eskov & Marusik, 1992 — North America, Asia
Acartauchenius Simon, 1884 — Asia, Africa, Europe
Acorigone Wunderlich, 2008 — Azores
Acroterius 	Irfan, Bashir & Peng, 2021 — China
Adelonetria Millidge, 1991 — Chile
Afribactrus Wunderlich, 1995 — South Africa
Afromynoglenes Merrett & Russell-Smith, 1996 — Ethiopia
Afroneta Holm, 1968 — Africa
Agnyphantes Hull, 1932 — Canada, Russia, China
Agyneta Hull, 1911 — South America, Asia, Africa, Europe, North America, Bermuda, Panama, Australia
Agyphantes Saaristo & Marusik, 2004 — Russia
Ainerigone Eskov, 1993 — Russia, Japan
Algarveneta Wunderlich, 2021 — Portugal
Alioranus Simon, 1926 — Asia, Greece
Allomengea Strand, 1912 — Asia, Canada
Allotiso Tanasevitch, 1990 — Turkey, Georgia
Anacornia Chamberlin & Ivie, 1933 — United States
Anguliphantes Saaristo & Tanasevitch, 1996 — Asia, Romania
Anibontes Chamberlin, 1924 — United States
Annapolis Millidge, 1984 — United States
Anodoration Millidge, 1991 — Brazil, Argentina
Anthrobia Tellkampf, 1844 — United States
Antrohyphantes Dumitrescu, 1971 — Bulgaria
Aperturina Tanasevitch, 2014 — Thailand, Malaysia
Aphileta Hull, 1920 — Kazakhstan, United States, Russia
Apobrata Miller, 2004 — Philippines
Aprifrontalia Oi, 1960 — Asia
Arachosinella Denis, 1958 — Asia
Araeoncus Simon, 1884 — Europe, Asia, Africa, New Zealand
Archaraeoncus Tanasevitch, 1987 — Asia, Europe
Arcterigone Eskov & Marusik, 1994 — Russia, Canada
Arcuphantes Chamberlin & Ivie, 1943 — North America, Asia
Ascetophantes Tanasevitch & Saaristo, 2006 — Nepal
Asemostera Simon, 1898 — Central America, South America
Asiafroneta Tanasevitch, 2020 — Borneo
Asiagone Tanasevitch, 2014 — Thailand, China, Laos
Asiceratinops Eskov, 1992 — Russia
Asiophantes Eskov, 1993 — Russia
Asperthorax Oi, 1960 — Russia, Japan, China
Asthenargellus Caporiacco, 1949 — Kenya
Asthenargoides Eskov, 1993 — Russia
Asthenargus Simon & Fage, 1922 — Africa, Europe, Asia
Atypena Simon, 1894 — Asia
Australolinyphia Wunderlich, 1976 — Australia
Australophantes Tanasevitch, 2012 — Indonesia, Australia
Bactrogyna Millidge, 1991 — Chile
Baryphyma Simon, 1884 — Europe, Asia
Baryphymula Eskov, 1992 — Japan
Bathylinyphia Eskov, 1992 — Asia
Bathyphantes Menge, 1866 — North America, Asia, Africa, Europe, Argentina, Oceania
Batueta Locket, 1982 — Asia
Bifurcia Saaristo, Tu & Li, 2006 — China, Russia
Birgerius Saaristo, 1973 — France, Spain
Bisetifer Tanasevitch, 1987 — Ukraine, Russia
Bishopiana Eskov, 1988 — Russia
Blestia Millidge, 1993 — United States
Bolephthyphantes Strand, 1901 — Greenland, Russia, Kazakhstan
Bolyphantes C. L. Koch, 1837 — Asia, Europe
Bordea Bosmans, 1995 — Portugal, Spain, France
Brachycerasphora Denis, 1962 — Africa, Asia
Bursellia Holm, 1962 — Africa
Caenonetria Millidge & Russell-Smith, 1992 — Indonesia
Callitrichia Fage, 1936 — Africa, Asia
Callosa Zhao & Li, 2017 — China
Camafroneta Frick & Scharff, 2018 — Cameroon
Cameroneta Bosmans & Jocqué, 1983 — Cameroon
Canariellanum Wunderlich, 1987 — Canary Is.
Canariphantes Wunderlich, 1992 — Africa, Israel, Europe
Capsulia Saaristo, Tu & Li, 2006 — China
Caracladus Simon, 1884 — Europe, Asia
Carorita Duffey & Merrett, 1963 — Russia, China
Cassafroneta Blest, 1979 — New Zealand
Catacercus Millidge, 1985 — Chile
Catonetria Millidge & Ashmole, 1994 — Ascension Is.
Caucasopisthes Tanasevitch, 1990 — Caucasus
Cautinella Millidge, 1985 — Chile
Caviphantes Oi, 1960 — Romania, Asia, United States
Centromerita Dahl, 1912 — United States, Canada
Centromerus Dahl, 1886 — Europe, Asia, Africa, North America
Centrophantes Miller & Polenec, 1975 — Slovenia, Austria
Ceraticelus Simon, 1884 — North America, Europe, Russia, Cuba
Ceratinella Emerton, 1882 — North America, Asia, Europe, Australia
Ceratinops Banks, 1905 — United States, Canada
Ceratinopsidis Bishop & Crosby, 1930 — United States
Ceratinopsis Emerton, 1882 — Africa, North America, Asia, Guatemala, Cuba
Ceratocyba Holm, 1962 — Kenya
Cheniseo Bishop & Crosby, 1935 — United States, Canada
Chenisides Denis, 1962 — Congo, Kenya
Cherserigone Denis, 1954 — Algeria
Chiangmaia Millidge, 1995 — Thailand
Chthiononetes Millidge, 1993 — Australia
Cinetata Wunderlich, 1995 — Georgia
Cirrosus Zhao & Li, 2014 — China
Claviphantes Tanasevitch & Saaristo, 2006 — Nepal
Cnephalocotes Simon, 1884 — Canada, Russia, France
Collinsia O. Pickard-Cambridge, 1913 — Asia, North America, Europe
Coloncus Chamberlin, 1949 — United States, Canada
Comorella Jocqué, 1985 — Comoros
Concavocephalus Eskov, 1989 — Russia
Conglin Zhao & Li, 2014 — China
Connithorax Eskov, 1993 — Russia
Coreorgonal Bishop & Crosby, 1935 — United States, Canada
Cornicephalus Saaristo & Wunderlich, 1995 — China
Cornitibia Lin, Lopardo & Uhl, 2022 - Nepal
Cresmatoneta Simon, 1929 — Asia
Crispiphantes Tanasevitch, 1992 — China, Korea, Russia
Crosbyarachne Charitonov, 1937 — Turkey, Europe
Crosbylonia Eskov, 1988 — Russia
Cryptolinyphia Millidge, 1991 — Colombia
Ctenophysis Millidge, 1985 — Chile
Curtimeticus Zhao & Li, 2014 — China
Cyphonetria Millidge, 1995 — Thailand
Dactylopisthes Simon, 1884 — Europe, Asia, North America
Dactylopisthoides Eskov, 1990 — Russia
Decipiphantes Saaristo & Tanasevitch, 1996 — Belarus, Asia
Deelemania Jocqué & Bosmans, 1983 — Africa
Dendronetria Millidge & Russell-Smith, 1992 — Indonesia
Denisiphantes Tu, Li & Rollard, 2005 — China
Diastanillus Simon, 1926 — France, Austria, Norway
Dicornua Oi, 1960 — Japan
Dicymbium Menge, 1868 — North America, Asia
Didectoprocnemis Denis, 1950 — Europe, Africa
Diechomma Millidge, 1991 — Colombia
Diplocentria Hull, 1911 — Asia, Sweden, North America
Diplocephaloides Oi, 1960 — Korea, Japan, China
Diplocephalus Bertkau, 1883 — Africa, Europe, North America, Asia
Diploplecta Millidge, 1988 — New Zealand
Diplostyla Emerton, 1882 — Turkey, Russia
Diplothyron Millidge, 1991 — Venezuela
Disembolus Chamberlin & Ivie, 1933 — United States, Canada
Dismodicus Simon, 1884 — Russia, North America, Europe
Doenitzius Oi, 1960 — Asia
Dolabritor Millidge, 1991 — Colombia
Donacochara Simon, 1884 — Angola
Drapetisca Menge, 1866 — United States, New Zealand, Asia
Drepanotylus Holm, 1945 — Asia, Bulgaria
Dresconella Denis, 1950 — France
Dubiaranea Mello-Leitão, 1943 — South America, Indonesia
Dumoga Millidge & Russell-Smith, 1992 — Indonesia
Dunedinia Millidge, 1988 — New Zealand, Australia
Eborilaira Eskov, 1989 — Russia
Eldonnia Tanasevitch, 2008 — Russia, Korea, Japan
Emenista Simon, 1894 — India
Emertongone Lin, Lopardo & Uhl, 2022 - USA
Enguterothrix Denis, 1962 — Congo, Asia
Entelecara Simon, 1884 — North America, Asia, Europe, Algeria
Eordea Simon, 1899 — Indonesia
Epibellowia Tanasevitch, 1996 — Russia, Japan
Epiceraticelus Crosby & Bishop, 1931 — United States
Epigyphantes Saaristo & Tanasevitch, 2004 — Russia
Epigytholus Tanasevitch, 1996 — Russia, Mongolia
Episolder Tanasevitch, 1996 — Russia
Epiwubana Millidge, 1991 — Chile
Eridantes Crosby & Bishop, 1933 — United States, Mexico, Canada
Erigokhabarum Tanasevitch, 2022 -  Russia (Far East)
Erigomicronus Tanasevitch, 2018 — Japan, Russia, China
Erigone Audouin, 1826 — North America, Europe, South America, Panama, Asia, Africa, Caribbean, Oceania
Erigonella Dahl, 1901 — Canada, Asia, France
Erigonoploides Eskov, 1989 — Russia
Erigonoplus Simon, 1884 — Europe, Asia, Morocco
Erigonops Scharff, 1990 — South Africa
Erigophantes Wunderlich, 1995 — Indonesia
Eskovia Marusik & Saaristo, 1999 — Russia, Canada, Mongolia
Eskovina Kocak & Kemal, 2006 — Russia, China, Korea
Esophyllas Prentice & Redak, 2012 — United States
Estrandia Blauvelt, 1936 — Russia, China, Japan
Eulaira Chamberlin & Ivie, 1933 — United States, Mexico
Eurymorion Millidge, 1993 — Brazil, Bolivia
Evansia O. Pickard-Cambridge, 1900 — Europe (Japan?)
Exechopsis Millidge, 1991 — South America
Exocora Millidge, 1991 — Brazil, Venezuela, Bolivia
Fageiella Kratochvíl, 1934 — Serbia, Montenegro
Falklandoglenes Usher, 1983 — Falkland Is.
Fissiscapus Millidge, 1991 — Ecuador, Colombia
Fistulaphantes Tanasevitch & Saaristo, 2006 — Nepal
Flagelliphantes Saaristo & Tanasevitch, 1996 — Russia
Floricomus Crosby & Bishop, 1925 — United States, Canada
Florinda O. Pickard-Cambridge, 1896 — United States, Mexico
Floronia Simon, 1887 — Ecuador, Asia
Formiphantes Saaristo & Tanasevitch, 1996 — Europe
Frederickus Paquin, Dupérré, Buckle & Crawford, 2008 — United States, Canada
Frontella Kulczyński, 1908 — Russia
Frontinella F. O. Pickard-Cambridge, 1902 — North America, China, El Salvador
Frontinellina van Helsdingen, 1969 — Asia, South Africa
Frontiphantes Wunderlich, 1987 — Madeira
Fusciphantes Oi, 1960 — Japan
Gibbafroneta Merrett, 2004 — Congo
Gibothorax Eskov, 1989 — Russia
Gigapassus Miller, 2007 — Argentina
Gladiata Zhao & Li, 2014 — China
Glebala Zhao & Li, 2014 — China
Glomerosus Zhao & Li, 2014 — China
Glyphesis Simon, 1926 — Asia, North America, Europe
Gnathonargus Bishop & Crosby, 1935 — United States
Gnathonarium Karsch, 1881 — Asia, North America
Gnathonaroides Bishop & Crosby, 1938 — United States, Canada
Gonatium Menge, 1868 — Asia, Europe, North America, Africa
Gonatoraphis Millidge, 1991 — Colombia
Goneatara Bishop & Crosby, 1935 — United States
Gongylidiellum Simon, 1884 — Africa, Asia, Romania, United States, Argentina
Gongylidioides Oi, 1960 — Asia
Gongylidium Menge, 1868 — Asia, Italy
Grammonota Emerton, 1882 — North America, Colombia, Central America, Caribbean
Graphomoa Chamberlin, 1924 — United States
Gravipalpus Millidge, 1991 — Brazil, Peru, Argentina
Habreuresis Millidge, 1991 — Chile
Halorates Hull, 1911 — Kazakhstan, Pakistan
Haplinis Simon, 1894 — New Zealand, Australia
Haplomaro Miller, 1970 — Angola
Helophora Menge, 1866 — Russia, China, United States
Helsdingenia Saaristo & Tanasevitch, 2003 — Asia, Africa
Herbiphantes Tanasevitch, 1992 — Russia, Korea, Japan
Heterolinyphia Wunderlich, 1973 — Bhutan, Nepal
Heterotrichoncus Wunderlich, 1970 — Europe, Russia
Hilaira Simon, 1884 — Asia, North America, Europe
Himalafurca Tanasevitch, 2021 — Nepal
Himalaphantes Tanasevitch, 1992 — Asia
Holma Locket, 1974 — Angola
Holmelgonia Jocqué & Scharff, 2007 — Africa
Holminaria Eskov, 1991 — Russia, Mongolia, China
Horcotes Crosby & Bishop, 1933 — United States, Russia, Canada
Houshenzinus Tanasevitch, 2006 — China
Hubertella Platnick, 1989 — Nepal
Hybauchenidium Holm, 1973 — Russia, North America, Europe
Hybocoptus Simon, 1884 — Algeria, Morocco, France
Hylyphantes Simon, 1884 — Asia
Hyperafroneta Blest, 1979 — New Zealand
Hypomma Dahl, 1886 — Asia, Macedonia, Equatorial Guinea, United States
Hypselistes Simon, 1894 — Asia, North America
Hypselocara Millidge, 1991 — Venezuela
Hypsocephalus Millidge, 1978 — France, Switzerland, Italy
Ibadana Locket & Russell-Smith, 1980 — Nigeria, Cameroon
Iberoneta Deeleman-Reinhold, 1984 — Spain
Icariella Brignoli, 1979 — Greece
Idionella Banks, 1893 — United States, Mexico
Improphantes Saaristo & Tanasevitch, 1996 — Asia, Africa, Europe
Incestophantes Tanasevitch, 1992 — Asia, Europe, North America
Indophantes Saaristo & Tanasevitch, 2003 — Asia
Intecymbium Miller, 2007 — Chile, Argentina
Ipa Saaristo, 2007 — Asia, Europe
Ipaoides Tanasevitch, 2008 — China
Islandiana Braendegaard, 1932 — North America, Russia, Europe
Ivielum Eskov, 1988 — Russia, Mongolia, Canada
Jacksonella Millidge, 1951 — Cyprus, Greece, Korea
Jalapyphantes Gertsch & Davis, 1946 — Mexico, Ecuador
Janetschekia Schenkel, 1939 — Europe
Javagone Tanasevitch, 2020 — Java
Javanaria Tanasevitch, 2020 — Java
Javanyphia Tanasevitch, 2020 — Java
Jilinus Lin, Lopardo & Uhl, 2022 - Russia (Far East), China, Korea
Johorea Locket, 1982 — Malaysia
Juanfernandezia Koçak & Kemal, 2008 — Chile
Kaestneria Wiehle, 1956 — Asia, North America
Kagurargus Ono, 2007 — Japan
Kalimagone Tanasevitch, 2017 — Malaysia
Karita Tanasevitch, 2007 — Europe, Russia
Kenocymbium Millidge & Russell-Smith, 1992 — Malaysia, Indonesia, Thailand
Ketambea Millidge & Russell-Smith, 1992 — Asia
Kikimora Eskov, 1988 — Finland, Russia
Knischatiria Wunderlich, 1976 — Australia, Indonesia, Malaysia
Koinothrix Jocqué, 1981 — Cape Verde Is.
Kolymocyba Eskov, 1989 — Russia
Kratochviliella Miller, 1938 — Europe
Labicymbium Millidge, 1991 — South America
Labulla Simon, 1884 — Europe, Russia
Labullinyphia van Helsdingen, 1985 — Sri Lanka
Labullula Strand, 1913 — Cameroon, Angola, Comoros
Laetesia Simon, 1908 — Oceania, Thailand
Lamellasia Tanasevitch, 2014 — Thailand
Laminacauda Millidge, 1985 — South America, Panama
Laminafroneta Merrett, 2004 — Africa
Laogone Tanasevitch, 2014 — China, Laos
Laperousea Dalmas, 1917 — Australia, New Zealand
Lasiargus Kulczyński, 1894 — Asia
Lepthyphantes Menge, 1866 — Asia, Africa, Europe, North America, Chile
Leptorhoptrum Kulczyński, 1894 — Russia, Japan
Leptothrix Menge, 1869 — Europe
Lessertia Smith, 1908 — Spain, Africa, Canada, New Zealand
Lessertinella Denis, 1947 — Europe
Lidia Saaristo & Marusik, 2004 — Kyrgyzstan, Kazakhstan
Limoneta Bosmans & Jocqué, 1983 — Cameroon, Kenya, South Africa
Linyphantes Chamberlin & Ivie, 1942 — United States, Canada, Mexico
Linyphia Latreille, 1804 — North America, Asia, South America, Central America, Africa, Europe, Oceania
Locketidium Jocqué, 1981 — Malawi, Kenya, Tanzania
Locketiella Millidge & Russell-Smith, 1992 — Indonesia
Locketina Kocak & Kemal, 2006 — Indonesia, Malaysia
Lomaita Bryant, 1948 — Dominican Republic
Lophomma Menge, 1868 — United States, Russia
Lotusiphantes Chen & Yin, 2001 — China
Lucrinus O. Pickard-Cambridge, 1904 — South Africa
Lygarina Simon, 1894 — South America
Machadocara Miller, 1970 — Congo, Zambia
Macrargus Dahl, 1886 — Europe, Asia
Maculoncus Wunderlich, 1995 — Taiwan, Greece, Israel
Malkinola Miller, 2007 — Chile
Mansuphantes Saaristo & Tanasevitch, 1996 — Europe, Asia
Maorineta Millidge, 1988 — New Zealand, Indonesia
Maro O. Pickard-Cambridge, 1906 — North America, Asia
Martensinus Wunderlich, 1973 — Nepal
Masikia Millidge, 1984 — Russia, United States, Canada
Maso Simon, 1884 — United States, Portugal, Algeria, Asia
Masoncus Chamberlin, 1949 — United States, Canada
Masonetta Chamberlin & Ivie, 1939 — United States
Mecopisthes Simon, 1926 — Europe, Africa, Asia
Mecynargoides Eskov, 1988 — Russia, Mongolia
Mecynargus Kulczyński, 1894 — Asia, North America, Europe
Mecynidis Simon, 1894 — Africa
Megafroneta Blest, 1979 — New Zealand
Megalepthyphantes Wunderlich, 1994 — Africa, Asia, Greece
Mermessus O. Pickard-Cambridge, 1899 — North America, Caribbean, Central America, South America, Asia, South Africa, New Zealand
Mesasigone Tanasevitch, 1989 — Asia
Metafroneta Blest, 1979 — New Zealand
Metaleptyphantes Locket, 1968 — Africa, Indonesia
Metamynoglenes Blest, 1979 — New Zealand
Metapanamomops Millidge, 1977 — Germany, Ukraine
Metopobactrus Simon, 1884 — Europe, North America, Asia
Micrargus Dahl, 1886 — North America, Europe, Asia, Uganda
Microbathyphantes van Helsdingen, 1985 — Asia, Africa
Microctenonyx Dahl, 1886 — Italy, Africa, United States, Oceania
Microcyba Holm, 1962 — Africa
Microlinyphia Gerhardt, 1928 — Africa, North America, Asia
Microneta Menge, 1869 — Sweden, South America, North America, Papua New Guinea, Saint Vincent and the Grenadines, Asia
Microplanus Millidge, 1991 — Colombia, Panama
Midia Saaristo & Wunderlich, 1995 — Europe
Miftengris Eskov, 1993 — Russia
Millidgea Locket, 1968 — Angola
Millidgella Kammerer, 2006 — Chile, Argentina
Minicia Thorell, 1875 — Asia, Europe, Algeria
Minyriolus Simon, 1884 — Argentina, Italy
Mioxena Simon, 1926 — Congo, Kenya, Angola
Mitrager van Helsdingen, 1985 — Indonesia
Moebelia Dahl, 1886 — Germany, China
Moebelotinus Wunderlich, 1995 — Russia, Mongolia
Molestia Tu, Saaristo & Li, 2006
Monocephalus Smith, 1906 — Europe
Monocerellus Tanasevitch, 1983 — Russia
Montilaira Chamberlin, 1921 — United States
Moreiraxena Miller, 1970 — Angola
Moyosi Miller, 2007 — Guyana, Brazil, Argentina
Mughiphantes Saaristo & Tanasevitch, 1999 — Asia, Europe
Murphydium Jocqué, 1996 — Kenya, Somalia
Mycula Schikora, 1994 — Germany, Austria, Italy
Myrmecomelix Millidge, 1993 — Peru, Ecuador
Mythoplastoides Crosby & Bishop, 1933 — United States
Napometa Benoit, 1977 — St. Helena
Nasoona Locket, 1982 — Asia, Venezuela
Nasoonaria Wunderlich & Song, 1995 — Asia
Nematogmus Simon, 1884 — Asia
Nenilinium Eskov, 1988 — Russia, Mongolia
Nentwigia Millidge, 1995 — Thailand, Indonesia
Neocautinella Baert, 1990 — Ecuador, Peru, Bolivia
Neodietrichia Özdikmen, 2008 — United States, Canada
Neoeburnella Koçak, 1986 — Côte d'Ivoire
Neomaso Forster, 1970 — Chile, Argentina, Brazil
Neonesiotes Millidge, 1991 — Seychelles, Fiji, Samoa
Neriene Blackwall, 1833 — Asia, Africa, North America, Europe
Neserigone Eskov, 1992 — Russia, Japan
Nesioneta Millidge, 1991 — Asia, Seychelles, Fiji
Nihonella Ballarin & Yamasaki, 2021 — Japan
Nippononeta Eskov, 1992 — Asia
Nipponotusukuru Saito & Ono, 2001 — Japan
Nispa Eskov, 1993 — Russia, Japan
Notholepthyphantes Millidge, 1985 — Chile
Nothophantes Merrett & Stevens, 1995 — Britain
Notiogyne Tanasevitch, 2007 — Russia
Notiohyphantes Millidge, 1985 — Mexico, South America
Notiomaso Banks, 1914 — Chile, Argentina
Notioscopus Simon, 1884 — South Africa, Asia
Notolinga Lavery & Dupérré, 2019 — Argentina & Falkland Is.
Novafroneta Blest, 1979 — New Zealand
Novafrontina Millidge, 1991 — South America, Mexico
Novalaetesia Millidge, 1988 — New Zealand
Nusoncus Wunderlich, 2008 — Europe
Oaphantes Chamberlin & Ivie, 1943 — United States
Obrimona Strand, 1934 — Sri Lanka
Obscuriphantes Saaristo & Tanasevitch, 2000 — Europe, Asia
Oculocornia Oliger, 1985 — Russia
Oedothorax Bertkau, 1883 — Europe, North America, Asia, Argentina, Africa
Oia Wunderlich, 1973 — Asia
Oilinyphia Ono & Saito, 1989 — China, Thailand, Japan
Okhotigone Eskov, 1993 — Russia, China, Japan
Onychembolus Millidge, 1985 — Chile, Argentina
Ophrynia Jocqué, 1981 — Tanzania, Malawi, Cameroon
Oreocyba Holm, 1962 — Kenya, Uganda
Oreoneta Kulczyński, 1894 — Asia, North America, Europe
Oreonetides Strand, 1901 — Asia, North America, Europe
Oreophantes Eskov, 1984 — United States, Canada
Orfeo Miller, 2007 — Brazil
Origanates Crosby & Bishop, 1933 — United States
Orsonwelles Hormiga, 2002 — Hawaii
Oryphantes Hull, 1932 — North America, Asia
Ostearius Hull, 1911 — South Africa, China, New Zealand
Ouedia Bosmans & Abrous, 1992 — Europe, Algeria
Pachydelphus Jocqué & Bosmans, 1983 — Gabon, Sierra Leone, Côte d'Ivoire
Pacifiphantes Eskov & Marusik, 1994 — North America, Asia
Pahangone Tanasevitch, 2018 — Malaysia
Paikiniana Eskov, 1992 — Korea, China, Japan
Palaeohyphantes Millidge, 1984 — Australia
Palliduphantes Saaristo & Tanasevitch, 2001 — Europe, Asia, Africa
Panamomops Simon, 1884 — Europe, Asia
Paracornicularia Crosby & Bishop, 1931 — United States
Paracymboides Tanasevitch, 2011 — India
Paraeboria Eskov, 1990 — Russia
Parafroneta Blest, 1979 — New Zealand
Paraglyphesis Eskov, 1991 — Russia
Paragongylidiellum Wunderlich, 1973 — India, Nepal
Paraletes Millidge, 1991 — Peru, Brazil
Parameioneta Locket, 1982 — Asia
Parapelecopsis Wunderlich, 1992 — Portugal, Georgia
Parasisis Eskov, 1984 — Asia
Paratapinocyba Saito, 1986 — Japan
Paratmeticus Marusik & Koponen, 2010 — Russia, Japan
Parawubanoides Eskov & Marusik, 1992 — Russia, Mongolia
Parbatthorax Tanasevitch, 2019 — Nepal
Parhypomma Eskov, 1992 — Japan
Paro Berland, 1942 — Austral Is.
Parvunaria Tanasevitch, 2018 — Myanmar
Patagoneta Millidge, 1985 — Chile
Pecado Hormiga & Scharff, 2005 — Spain, Morocco, Algeria
Pelecopsidis Bishop & Crosby, 1935 — United States
Pelecopsis Simon, 1864 — Africa, Europe, North America, Asia
Peponocranium Simon, 1884 — Asia, Europe
Perlongipalpus Eskov & Marusik, 1991 — Russia, Mongolia
Perregrinus Tanasevitch, 1992 — Asia, Canada
Perro Tanasevitch, 1992 — Russia, Canada
Phanetta Keyserling, 1886 — United States
Phlattothrata Crosby & Bishop, 1933 — United States, Russia
Phyllarachne Millidge & Russell-Smith, 1992 — Indonesia
Piesocalus Simon, 1894 — Indonesia
Piniphantes Saaristo & Tanasevitch, 1996 — Europe, Asia
Pityohyphantes Simon, 1929 — North America, Asia
Plaesianillus Simon, 1926 — France
Platyspira Song & Li, 2009 — China
Plectembolus Millidge & Russell-Smith, 1992 — Philippines, Malaysia, Indonesia
Plesiophantes Heimer, 1981 — Russia, Georgia, Turkey
Plicatiductus Millidge & Russell-Smith, 1992 — Indonesia
Pocadicnemis Simon, 1884 — North America, Europe, Asia
Pocobletus Simon, 1894 — Saint Vincent and the Grenadines, Costa Rica, Venezuela
Poecilafroneta Blest, 1979 — New Zealand
Poeciloneta Kulczyński, 1894 — Asia, North America
Porrhomma Simon, 1884 — Asia, North America, Europe
Praestigia Millidge, 1954 — Canada, Europe, Asia
Primerigonina Wunderlich, 1995 — Panama
Prinerigone Millidge, 1988 — Africa, Asia
Priperia Simon, 1904 — Hawaii
Procerocymbium Eskov, 1989 — Russia, Canada
Proelauna Jocqué, 1981 — Angola, Tanzania, Malawi
Proislandiana Tanasevitch, 1985 — Russia
Promynoglenes Blest, 1979 — New Zealand
Pronasoona Millidge, 1995 — Thailand, Malaysia
Prosoponoides Millidge & Russell-Smith, 1992 — Asia
Protoerigone Blest, 1979 — New Zealand
Pseudafroneta Blest, 1979 — New Zealand
Pseudocarorita Wunderlich, 1980 — Central Europe
Pseudocyba Tanasevitch, 1984 — Russia, Kazakhstan
Pseudohilaira Eskov, 1990 — Russia
Pseudomaro Denis, 1966 — Europe
Pseudomaso Locket & Russell-Smith, 1980 — Nigeria
Pseudomicrargus Eskov, 1992 — Japan
Pseudomicrocentria Miller, 1970 — South Africa, Malaysia
Pseudoporrhomma Eskov, 1993 — Russia
Pseudotyphistes Brignoli, 1972 — South America
Pseudowubana Eskov & Marusik, 1992 — Russia, Mongolia
Psilocymbium Millidge, 1991 — South America
Racata Millidge, 1995 — Indonesia, Thailand
Rhabdogyna Millidge, 1985 — Chile
Ringina Tambs-Lyche, 1954 — Crozet Is.
Russocampus Tanasevitch, 2004 — Russia
Ryojius Saito & Ono, 2001 — Korea, Japan, China
Saaristoa Millidge, 1978 — Japan, United States
Sachaliphantes Saaristo & Tanasevitch, 2004 — Asia
Saitonia Eskov, 1992 — China, Japan, Korea
Saloca Simon, 1926 — Turkey, Nepal, Russia
Satilatlas Keyserling, 1886 — United States, Canada, Russia
Sauron Eskov, 1995 — Russia, Kazakhstan
Savignia Blackwall, 1833 — Asia, United States, Australia, Europe, Comoros
Savigniorrhipis Wunderlich, 1992 — Azores
Scandichrestus Wunderlich, 1995 — Sweden, Finland, Russia
Sciastes Bishop & Crosby, 1938 — Europe, Russia, North America
Scirites Bishop & Crosby, 1938 — United States, Canada
Scironis Bishop & Crosby, 1938 — United States
Scolecura Millidge, 1991 — Brazil, Colombia, Argentina
Scolopembolus Bishop & Crosby, 1938 — United States
Scotargus Simon, 1913 — Algeria, Russia
Scotinotylus Simon, 1884 — Asia, North America, Europe
Scutpelecopsis Marusik & Gnelitsa, 2009 — Asia, Romania
Scylaceus Bishop & Crosby, 1938 — United States, Canada
Scyletria Bishop & Crosby, 1938 — United States, Canada
Selenyphantes Gertsch & Davis, 1946 — Mexico, Guatemala
Semljicola Strand, 1906 — Asia, Europe, North America
Sengletus Tanasevitch, 2008 — Egypt, Israel, Iran
Shaanxinus Tanasevitch, 2006 — China
Shanus Tanasevitch, 2006 — China
Sibirocyba Eskov & Marusik, 1994 — Russia
Silometopoides Eskov, 1990 — Asia, North America, Greenland
Silometopus Simon, 1926 — Europe, Asia
Simplicistilus Locket, 1968 — West & Central Africa
Singatrichona Tanasevitch, 2019 — Singapore
Sinolinyphia Wunderlich & Li, 1995
Sinopimoa Li & Wunderlich, 2008 — China
Sintula Simon, 1884 — Asia, Europe, Africa
Sisicottus Bishop & Crosby, 1938 — United States, Canada, Russia
Sisicus Bishop & Crosby, 1938 — Russia, United States, Canada
Sisis Bishop & Crosby, 1938 — United States, Canada
Sisyrbe Bishop & Crosby, 1938 — United States
Sitalcas Bishop & Crosby, 1938 — United States
Smerasia Zhao & Li, 2014 — China
Smermisia Simon, 1894 — South America, Costa Rica
Smodix Bishop & Crosby, 1938 — United States, Canada
Solenysa Simon, 1894 — Asia
Soucron Crosby & Bishop, 1936 — United States, Canada
Souessa Crosby & Bishop, 1936 — United States
Souessoula Crosby & Bishop, 1936 — United States
Sougambus Crosby & Bishop, 1936 — United States, Canada
Souidas Crosby & Bishop, 1936 — United States
Soulgas Crosby & Bishop, 1936 — United States
Spanioplanus Millidge, 1991 — Venezuela, Peru
Sphecozone O. Pickard-Cambridge, 1871 — South America, United States, Trinidad
Spiralophantes Tanasevitch & Saaristo, 2006 — Nepal
Spirembolus Chamberlin, 1920 — United States, Canada, Mexico
Stemonyphantes Menge, 1866 — Asia, Ukraine, North America
Sthelota Simon, 1894 — Panama, Guatemala
Stictonanus Millidge, 1991 — Chile
Strandella Oi, 1960 — Asia
Strongyliceps Fage, 1936 — Kenya, Uganda
Styloctetor Simon, 1884 — Europe, North America, Asia
Subbekasha Millidge, 1984 — Canada
Syedra Simon, 1884 — Europe, Asia, Congo
Symmigma Crosby & Bishop, 1933 — United States
Tachygyna Chamberlin & Ivie, 1939 — United States, Canada
Taibainus Tanasevitch, 2006 — China
Taibaishanus Tanasevitch, 2006 — China
Tallusia Lehtinen & Saaristo, 1972 — Asia, Greece
Tanasevitchia Marusik & Saaristo, 1999 — Russia
Tapinocyba Simon, 1884 — Europe, Algeria, North America, Asia
Tapinocyboides Wiehle, 1960 — India
Tapinopa Westring, 1851 — United States, Europe, Asia
Tapinotorquis Dupérré & Paquin, 2007 — United States, Canada
Taranucnus Simon, 1884 — Europe, Asia, United States
Tarsiphantes Strand, 1905 — Russia, Canada, Greenland
Tchatkalophantes Tanasevitch, 2001 — Asia
Tegulinus Tanasevitch, 2017 — Indonesia
Tennesseellum Petrunkevitch, 1925 — United States
Tenuiphantes Saaristo & Tanasevitch, 1996 — Asia, Europe, Africa, North America, South America, New Zealand
Ternatus Sun, Li & Tu, 2012
Tessamoro Eskov, 1993 — Russia
Thainetes Millidge, 1995 — Thailand
Thaiphantes Millidge, 1995 — Thailand
Thaleria Tanasevitch, 1984 — Russia, United States
Thapsagus Simon, 1894 — Madagascar
Thaumatoncus Simon, 1884 — Europe, Algeria, Israel
Theoa Saaristo, 1995 — Asia, Seychelles
Theoneta Eskov & Marusik, 1991 — Russia
Theonina Simon, 1929 — Russia, Algeria
Thyreobaeus Simon, 1889 — Madagascar
Thyreosthenius Simon, 1884 — Russia
Tibiaster Tanasevitch, 1987 — Kazakhstan
Tibioploides Eskov & Marusik, 1991 — Asia, Estonia
Tibioplus Chamberlin & Ivie, 1947 — Asia, United States
Tiso Simon, 1884 — Canada, Greenland, Asia
Tmeticodes Ono, 2010 — Japan
Tmeticus Menge, 1868 — Asia, North America
Tojinium Saito & Ono, 2001 — Japan
Toltecaria Miller, 2007 — Mexico
Tomohyphantes Millidge, 1995 — Indonesia
Toschia Caporiacco, 1949 — Africa
Totua Keyserling, 1891 — Brazil
Trachyneta Holm, 1968 — Congo, Malawi
Traematosisis Bishop & Crosby, 1938 — United States
Trematocephalus Dahl, 1886 — Asia, France
Trichobactrus Wunderlich, 1995 — Mongolia
Trichoncoides Denis, 1950 — France, Asia
Trichoncus Simon, 1884 — Europe, Africa, Asia
Trichoncyboides Wunderlich, 2008 — Switzerland, Germany, Austria
Trichopterna Kulczyński, 1894 — Asia, Europe, Africa
Trichopternoides Wunderlich, 2008 — Europe
Triplogyna Millidge, 1991 — Brazil, Argentina, Colombia
Troglohyphantes Joseph, 1881 — Europe, Algeria, Asia
Troxochrota Kulczyński, 1894 — Russia
Troxochrus Simon, 1884 — Europe, Asia, Angola
Tubercithorax Eskov, 1988 — Russia
Tunagyna Chamberlin & Ivie, 1933 — Russia, Canada, United States
Turbinellina Millidge, 1993 — Chile, Argentina
Turinyphia van Helsdingen, 1982 — China, Korea, Japan
Tusukuru Eskov, 1993 — United States, Russia
Tutaibo Chamberlin, 1916 — North America, South America, Guatemala
Tybaertiella Jocqué, 1979 — Côte d'Ivoire, Nigeria, Ethiopia
Typhistes Simon, 1894 — Sri Lanka, Ethiopia, South Africa
Typhlonyphia Kratochvíl, 1936 — Croatia
Typhochrestinus Eskov, 1990 — Russia
Typhochrestoides Eskov, 1990 — Russia
Typhochrestus Simon, 1884 — Europe, Africa, Asia, North America
Uahuka Berland, 1935 — Marquesas Is.
Uapou Berland, 1935 — Marquesas Is.
Ulugurella Jocqué & Scharff, 1986 — Tanzania
Ummeliata Strand, 1942 — Asia
Uralophantes Esyunin, 1992 — Ukraine, Russia
Ussurigone Eskov, 1993 — Russia
Uusitaloia Marusik, Koponen & Danilov, 2001 — Russia
Vagiphantes Saaristo & Tanasevitch, 2004 — Central Asia
Venia Seyfulina & Jocqué, 2009 — Kenya
Vermontia Millidge, 1984 — United States, Canada, Russia
Vesicapalpus Millidge, 1991 — Brazil, Argentina
Vietnagone Tanasevitch, 2019 — China, Vietnam
Viktorium Eskov, 1988 — Russia
Vittatus Zhao & Li, 2014 — China
Wabasso Millidge, 1984 — Russia, North America, Greenland
Walckenaeria Blackwall, 1833 — Europe, Asia, Africa, North America, Central America, Colombia, Cuba
Walckenaerianus Wunderlich, 1995 — Asia, Bulgaria
Wiehlea Braun, 1959 — Western Europe
Wiehlenarius Eskov, 1990 — Russia, Europe
Wubana Chamberlin, 1919 — United States
Wubanoides Eskov, 1986 — Russia, Japan, Mongolia
Xim Ibarra-Núñez, Chamé-Vázquez & Maya-Morales, 2021 — Mexico
Yakutopus Eskov, 1990 — Russia
Yuelushannus Irfan et al., 2020 — China
Zerogone Eskov & Marusik, 1994 — Russia
Zhezhoulinyphia Irfan, Zhou & Peng, 2019 — China
Zilephus Simon, 1902 — Argentina
Zornella Jackson, 1932 — North America, Asia
Zygottus Chamberlin, 1949 — United States

Gallery

See also
List of Linyphiidae species (A–H)
List of Linyphiidae species (I–P)
List of Linyphiidae species (Q–Z)

References

 Bosselaers, J & Henderickx, H. (2002) A new Savignia from Cretan caves (Araneae: Linyphiidae). Zootaxa 109:1-8 PDF
 Hågvar, S. & Aakra, K. 2006. Spiders active on snow in Southern Norway. Norw. J. Entomol. 53, 71-82.

External links

Frontinella pyramitela web (photo)
ToL on Linyphiidae
 Spiders rebuild webs en masse after floods in Wagga Wagga  Australian Geographic News report
 

 
Araneomorphae families